Parque station is part of the Blue Line of the Lisbon Metro.

History
Parque is one of the 11 stations that belong to the original Lisbon Metro network, opened on 29 December 1959. 

This station is located on Avenida António Augusto de Aguiar. It takes its name from the nearby Parque Eduardo VII. 

The architectural design of the original station is by Francisco Keil do Amaral. On 29 December 1994 the station was refurbished, based on the architectural design of Sanchez Jorge.

Connections

Urban buses

Carris 
 726 Sapadores ⇄ Pontinha Centro
 746 Marquês de Pombal ⇄ Estação Damaia

See also
 List of Lisbon metro stations

References

External links

Blue Line (Lisbon Metro) stations
Railway stations opened in 1959